Nasrollahabad (also Romanized as Naşrollāhābād) is a village in Lulaman Rural District, in the Central District of Fuman County, Gilan Province, Iran. At the 2006 census, its population was 81, in 18 families.

References 

Populated places in Fuman County